The 1972 United States Senate election in Louisiana was held on November 9, 1972. 

Former State Representative J. Bennett Johnston was elected to the Senate to succeed First Lady of Louisiana Elaine Edwards, who had been appointed by her husband on an interim basis following the death of Senator Allen Ellender. Following Johnston's victory in the general election, Elaine Edwards resigned and Governor Edwin Edwards appointed Johnston, so that he could gain seniority in the Senate.

Democratic primary

Candidates

Declared
 Frank Tunney Allen, resident of West Monroe
 J. Bennett Johnston, former State Representative and candidate for Governor in 1971

Deceased
 Allen Ellender, incumbent Senator

Senator Ellender died July 27, a few weeks before the August 19 primary, but his name remained on the ballot.

Results

Republican primary

Candidates
 Ben Toledano, attorney and nominee for Mayor of New Orleans in 1970

Withdrew
 Charles M. McLean

Results
Following Ellender's death, the Republican Party replaced presumptive nominee Charles McLean with attorney and New Orleans mayoral candidate Ben Toledano. Toledano was unopposed for the Republican nomination.

Independents and third parties

American Independent
 Hall Lyons, Republican nominee for Louisiana's 3rd congressional district in 1966

Independent
 John J. McKeithen, former Governor of Louisiana

Following Ellender's death, former Governor John McKeithen joined the race as an independent candidate. He initially hoped to enter the race as a Democrat but was barred by party leaders from entering the primary. He campaigned against the Democratic Party's presidential nominee, George McGovern.

General election

Campaign
The sudden death of Ellender and the independent candidacy of former Governor McKeithen made this a rare competitive general election in Louisiana. The Republican Party had not seriously contested one of Louisiana's Senate seats since Reconstruction, and Republican leaders believed McKeithen's presence in the race could split the Democratic vote.

McKeithen ran a populist, agrarian campaign against Johnston, citing his own investment in the state's agriculture industry and attempting to portray Johnston as an urban elitist, similar to McKeithen's campaign against former New Orleans Mayor deLesseps Story Morrison in the 1963-64 governor's race. All three major candidates supported President Nixon's handling of the Vietnam War.

Results

See also 
 1972 United States Senate elections

References 

1972
Louisiana
United States Senate